Epsin-2 is a protein that in humans is encoded by the EPN2 gene.

This gene encodes a protein which interacts with clathrin and adaptor-related protein complex 2, alpha 1 subunit. The protein is found in a brain-derived clathrin-coated vesicle fraction and localizes to the peri-Golgi region and the cell periphery. The protein is thought to be involved in clathrin-mediated endocytosis. Alternate splicing of this gene results in two transcript variants encoding different isoforms.

References

Further reading